Music Time is a British educational television programme that primarily focused on music as part of the BBC Schools strand from 23 September 1970 to 18 March 1991. It was first presented by Mari Griffith and Ian Humphris from 1970 to 1972, it was then presented by Kathryn Harries and Peter Combe from 1977 to 1981, and finally presented by Jonathan Cohen and Helen Speirs from 1983 to 1991. It first aired on BBC1 from 1970 to 1981, and then aired on BBC2 from 1983 to 1991.

Format
The programme is aimed at primary school children aged between 7 and 9. It teaches singing, instrumentation, and basic elements of music theory and performance through simple, easily understandable songs. These often form part of a production intended to be performed by schools, and usually performed at the end of the programme (though in later years, as with Tarfa and the Trolls, the full performance was sometimes at the beginning of the programme). This would often be a pantomime in the autumn term. The programme also includes animated films (usually produced by Bura and Hardwick) based on classical works such as Coppélia, Lieutenant Kijé and Háry János.

Episodes

External links
 BBC Music Time clip
 Music Time at Broadcast for Schools

1970 British television series debuts
1991 British television series endings
1970s British children's television series
1980s British children's television series
1990s British children's television series
1970s British music television series
1980s British music television series
1990s British music television series
British television shows for schools
BBC children's television shows
Music education in the United Kingdom